The Pakistan women's national cricket team, also known as Green Shirts or Women in Green, represents Pakistan in international women's cricket. One of eight teams competing in the ICC Women's Championship (the highest level of international women's cricket), the team is organised by the Pakistan Cricket Board (PCB), a Full Member of the International Cricket Council (ICC).

Pakistan made its One Day International (ODI) debut in early 1997, against New Zealand, and later in the year played in the 1997 World Cup in India. The team's inaugural Test match came against Sri Lanka in April 1998. In its early years, Pakistan was one of the least competitive of the top-level women's teams, and after its inaugural appearance in 1997, did not qualify for another World Cup until the 2009 event in Australia. However, the team has played in all four editions of the Women's World Twenty20 to date, and also participated in the Women's Asia Cup and the Asian Games cricket tournament.

The increase in terrorism as a result of the war on terror led to a stagnation of foreign teams touring Pakistan. However, due to a decrease in terrorism in Pakistan over the past few years, as well as an increase in security, West Indies women's cricket team and Bangladesh women's national cricket team have toured Pakistan multiple times since 2015.

Support staff
 Head Coach:  Mark Coles
 Bowling Coach:  Arshad Khan
 Assistant Coach:  Kamran Hussain

History

1990s
The concept of Women's cricket was first introduced in Pakistan by two sisters Shaiza and Sharmeen Khan in 1996. In conservative Pakistan the creation of a Pakistan women`s cricket team was even considered illegal and was  met with court cases and even death threats. The government refused them permission to play India in 1997 and ruled that women were forbidden from playing sports in public due to the religious issues.

However, the team did manage to overcome these objections and represented Pakistan in 1997, playing against New Zealand and Australia. They lost all three One Day International matches on that tour, but they were still invited to take part in the Women's Cricket World Cup later that year in India. They lost all five matches in the tournament and finished last, out of the eleven teams in the competition. The following year, Pakistan toured Sri Lanka and played three One Day International matches, losing all of their matches and played in their first Test match, which they also lost.

2000s
In 2000, Pakistan toured Ireland for a five match One Day International series against Ireland. They lost the Test match by an innings inside two days and the One Day International series 4–0, with one match interrupted by rain. Their first international win, in their 19th match, came against the Netherlands in a seven match One Day International series at their home ground in 2001, a series which they won 4–3. This form did not continue into their six One Day International tour of Sri Lanka in January 2002 though and they again lost all six matches.

In 2003, Pakistan travelled to the Netherlands to take part in the 2003 IWCC Trophy, the inaugural edition of what is now called simply the World Cup Qualifier. They finished fourth in the tournament, their victories were against Japan and Scotland, however they were missing out on qualification for the 2005 World Cup. This tournament was marred by a schism between the Pakistan Women's Cricket Control Association and the Pakistan Cricket Board. The IWCC did not recognise the Pakistan Cricket Board as the governing body of women's cricket in Pakistan and court cases were brought in Pakistan. The Pakistan Cricket Board announced that they would not be sending a team to the tournament and that no other team should be allowed to represent the country in the competition. This problem has since been overcome with the International Cricket Council requirement that women's associations and men's associations are unified under one single governing body.

2004 saw the West Indies tour Pakistan, playing seven One Day International matches and a Test match. The Test match was drawn and West Indies won the One Day International series 5–2, but those two victories for Pakistan were their first against a Test playing nation.

In 2005, Pakistan Cricket Board established a Women's Wing to oversee all Cricket Affairs under the Pakistan Cricket Board's control and to unite all the conflicts between various associations. The first international event was when Indian Under 21 team toured Pakistan, becoming the first Indian women's side to tour the country. This paved the way for Pakistan to host the second Women's Asia Cup in December 2005/January 2006. They lost all their games however, finishing last in the three team tournament. The tournament featured the first match between the Indian and Pakistani women's cricket teams.

Early in 2007, the Pakistan squad toured South Africa and played in a five match, One Day International series. During that year, Pakistan was awarded to Host the ICC Women's World Cup Qualifiers in which eight teams were scheduled to participate. All of the arrangements were almost completed when unfortunately the event was postponed due to political instability and was moved to South Africa. The Pakistan Women Team qualified for the ICC Women World Cup by defeating Ireland, Zimbabwe, Scotland and Netherlands. They qualified for this tournament after defeating Hong Kong in a three match series in Pakistan in September 2006.

In Pakistan, views towards Women' cricket have softened considerably since its introduction. Cricket is currently seen as an improvement for women's rights.

In June 2019, the PCB reduced the number of contracted players from 17 to 10, but increased remuneration for the retained players.

World Cup records

Women's ODI World Cup

Pakistan have participated in four editions of the Women's Cricket World Cup: 1997 Women's Cricket World Cup, 2009 Women's Cricket World Cup, 2013 Women's Cricket World Cup and 2017 Women's Cricket World Cup. The team did not win any of their matches during the 1997 Cricket World Cup and finished at eleventh place. Pakistan saw their first win in the 2009 World Cup; they advanced to the Super Six round defeating Sri Lanka in group stage match by 57 runs with Nain Abidi scoring 26 runs, and the player of the match Qanita Jalil taking 3 wickets for 33. They qualified for the 5th place playoff match defeating West Indies in the Super Sixes by 4 wickets, but finished at 6th place losing to the same team by 3 wickets. They were winless in both the 2013 World Cup and the 2017 World Cup.

Women's T20I World Cup

Pakistan have participated in all the editions of the ICC Women's World Twenty20. They lost all of their games in 2009 ICC Women's World Twenty20 and 2010 ICC Women's World Twenty20. In the 2012 edition, they registered their solitary win over India. Pakistan defeated them by 1 run with Sana Mir scoring 26 runs and Nida Dar—who was awarded player of the match—taking 3 wickets for 12 runs. Pakistan finished with 7th place playoff in the 2014 ICC Women's World Twenty20; they defeated Sri Lanka by 14 runs in the playoffs. Bismah Maroof scored 62 runs not out and Sania Khan took 3 wickets for 24 runs. Maroof was awarded woman of the match.

Asia Cup

The Pakistan women's cricket team did not participate in the inaugural edition of the women's Asia cup in 2004–05, Sri Lanka and India played a five-match series in Sri Lanka. Pakistan hosted the second edition of the Asia Cup in 2005–06, but they did not win a single game of the tournament. India won the final by 97 runs, against Sri Lanka, played at the National Stadium, Karachi. In the third edition of the women's Asia Cup, once again Pakistan failed to see a victory, and this was the third consecutive occasion that India and Sri Lanka were playing in the final. In the 2008 edition of the Women's Asia Cup, Pakistan registered their only victory against the Bangladeshi women's cricket team who were participating for the first time in Asia Cup.

The 2012 edition was a Twenty20 version of the game that took place in Guangzhou, China from 24 to 31 October 2012. Pakistan reached into the final of the tournament, and lost to India by 18 runs. Bismah Maroof was awarded woman of the tournament for her all-round performance.

Asian Games

Asian Games 2010

The Pakistan national women's cricket team won a gold medal in the inaugural women's cricket tournament in the 2010 Asian Games that took place in Guangzhou, China. In the final match at the 2010 Asian Games, Pakistan defeated Bangladesh women cricket team by 10 wickets. Bangladeshi women made 92 runs for 9 wickets with their captain Salma Khatun scoring 24; Nida Dar took 3 wickets giving away 16 runs in 4 overs. Pakistan women achieved the target of 93 runs in 15.4 overs without losing wickets: Dar scored 51 from 43 balls and Javeria Khan scored 39 runs from 51 balls, both remained not out. Asif Ali Zardari, the then-president of Pakistan, termed the team's win as a "gift to the nation riding on a series of crises" as 21 million people were affected by flood in 2010.

Asian Games 2014

In the 2014 Asian games, Pakistan women's cricket team defeated again Bangladesh women cricket team in the final match by four runs in Incheon, South Korea. In the low scoring match, Pakistan women scored 97 runs in 20 for 6 wickets. The match was interrupted by rain. Bangladesh women innings reduced to 7 overs and their revised target was 43 runs per Duckworth–Lewis method; they scored 38 runs for 9 wickets. This was the second consecutive title won by the Pakistan women against the same team in Asian Games.

Tournament history

A red box around the year indicates tournaments played within Pakistan

World Cup

World T20

Asia Cup

One-Day Internationals

Twenty20 Internationals

Asian Games

Captains

Honours

ACC
Women's Asia Cup:
 Runners-up (2): 2012, 2016

Others
Asian Games
 Gold  Medal (2): 2010, 2014

Players

Former players

Squad
This lists all the players who have a central contract or was named in the most recent ODI or T20I squad. Uncapped players are listed in italics. Updated as on 3 Aug 2022

Records and Statistics 

International Match Summary — Pakistan Women

Last updated 21 February 2023

Women's Test cricket

Highest team total: 426/7d v. West Indies on 15 March 2004 at National Stadium, Karachi.
Highest individual score: 242, Kiran Baluch v. West Indies on 15 March 2004 at National Stadium, Karachi.
Best innings bowling: 7/59, Shaiza Khan v. West Indies on 15 March 2004 at National Stadium, Karachi.

Most Test runs for Pakistan Women

Most Test wickets for Pakistan Women

Women's Test record versus other nations

Records complete to Women's Test #122. Last updated 18 March 2004.

Women's One-Day International

Highest team total: 335/3 v. Ireland on 4 November 2022 at Gaddafi Stadium, Lahore.
Highest individual score: 176*, Sidra Ameen v. Ireland on 4 November 2022 at Gaddafi Stadium, Lahore.
Best innings bowling: 7/4, Sajjida Shah v. Japan on 21 July 2003 at Sportpark Drieburg, Amsterdam.

Most ODI runs for Pakistan Women

Most ODI wickets for Pakistan Women

Highest individual innings in Women's ODI

Best bowling figures in an innings in Women's ODI

WODI record versus other nations

Records complete to WODI #1311. Last updated 21 January 2023.

Women's T20I cricket 

Highest team total: 177/5, v. Malaysia on 7 June 2018 at Royal Selangor Club, Kuala Lumpur.
Highest individual innings: 102, Muneeba Ali v. Ireland on 15 February 2023 at Newlands Cricket Ground, Cape Town.
Best innings bowling: 5/21, Nida Dar v. Sri Lanka on 6 June 2018 at Kinrara Academy Oval, Kuala Lumpur.

Most WT20I runs for Pakistan Women

Most WT20I wickets for Pakistan Women

Highest individual innings in Women's T20I

Best bowling figures in an innings in Women's T20I

WT20I record versus other nations

Records complete to WT20I #1374. Last updated 21 February 2023.

''Note: Pakistan Women lost all 3 tied matches against West Indies in Super Over.

See also

List of Pakistan women Test cricketers
List of Pakistan women ODI cricketers
List of Pakistan women Twenty20 International cricketers
Pakistan women's under-19 cricket team

References

Further reading

External links
 
 Pakistan Women's Cricket Team Probables
 Yahoo! Cricket – Pakistan's Women Cricket Team
 Pakistan's Women Cricket Team in ICC World Cup Qualifier

 
Women's cricket in Pakistan
Women's national cricket teams
Cricket
Women
1997 establishments in Pakistan